Robert W. White (1904–2001) was an American psychologist whose professional interests centered on the study of personality, both normal and abnormal. His book The Abnormal Personality, published in 1948, became the standard textbook on Abnormal Psychology.

A historian in perspective, White did not focus entirely on abnormal psychology, but investigated the coping methods of  normal people.  Diverging from Freud whose thinking dominated psychology at the time, he emphasized that individuals were also driven by needs to be competent and effective in the world.

He began teaching at Harvard University in 1937 and retired from teaching in 1964. During World War II, White became acting director of Harvard's psychological clinic. He was head of Harvard's clinical psychology program and chairman of the social relations department. In 1969 he was awarded professor emeritus.

He graduated from Harvard University in 1925.

Selected publications
The Abnormal Psychology (1948) 
Lives in Progress: A Study of the Natural Growth of Personality (1952)
"Motivation reconsidered: The concept of competence"
"Prediction of hypnotic susceptibility from a knowledge of subjects' attitudes" Journal of Psychology (1936)
"Introductions to historical psychology"

References

External links
Theorists and Key Figures - Robert W. White

20th-century American psychologists
1904 births
2001 deaths
Harvard University faculty
Personality psychologists
Harvard College alumni
Harvard Graduate School of Arts and Sciences alumni